The Letters Page is a 1955 Italian comedy film directed by Steno, starring Alberto Sordi. Actually the film's full title is Piccola posta ovvero: cercasi vecchia con dote (translation: "The Letters Page, or Searching for a Rich Older Woman"). Co-writer Lucio Fulci has a cameo appearance in the film (young man with glasses).  Cameraman Delli Colli's wife (Alexandra) years later wound up co-starring in one of Fulci's later slasher films, The New York Ripper (1982).

Piccola Posta is a sequel of sorts to Steno's earlier film A Day in Court, similarly formatted into a series of short vignettes, each involving different characters, and the stories are all tied together through Lady Eva and her "Dear Abby"-style column. Steno said in interviews that he liked Sordi and allowed him to adlib some of the scenes, Sordi basing his material on past experiences he claimed to have had with older women.

Plot
Alberto Sordi plays Rodolfo Vanzino, a phony nobleman / con man who runs a nursing home in which he preys upon the aged old ladies in his care, hoping to get their insurance money when they die. Franca Valeri plays Lady Eva, a seemingly wealthy Polish woman of noble birth, who writes a popular "Advice to the Lovelorn" column in a newspaper. Although Eva is well intentioned, her advice get some of her readers in a bind, such as one woman who enters Vanzino's nursing home as a patient on Eva's advice. But although she freely dispenses romantic advice to her readers, her own love life suffers as she is hopelessly in love with a veterinarian who doesn't even known she exists. The phony noblewoman opens a dog salon in the hopes of attracting her true love's attention, but the dogs escape and cause a disturbance in the town. The finale has a number of the characters all meeting up again at the local police station for various reasons.

Cast 
 Franca Valeri Lady Eva
 Alberto Sordi: Rodolfo Vanzino
 Peppino De Filippo: Gigliozzi
 Memmo Carotenuto: Ranuccio
 Anna Maria Pancani: Franchina
 Nanda Primavera: Lady Eva's Mother
 Sergio Raimondi:  Marco Cappelli
 Amalia Pellegrini: Donna Virginia
 Nietta Zocchi: Gigliozzi's Wife
 Nicoletta Orsomando: Herself
 Vincenzo Talarico: The Editor 
 Salvo Libassi: Eng. Tamburella

References

External links
 

1955 films
Italian comedy films
1955 comedy films
Films directed by Stefano Vanzina
Italian black-and-white films
1950s Italian films